Paolo Giorza (11 November 1832 – 4 March 1914) was an Italian-Australian composer of classical music and Romantic music.

He was born in Milan, son of Luigi Giorza, a painter and singer. His father prompted his musical interest. He is revered in Milan, where he wrote the song "" in 1858, performed at the Milan Carcano Theatre. The song became symbolic of Italian culture.

During his lifetime, he produced and wrote many scores including various waltzes. Giorza travelled much of the world working in Venice, Vienna, London and Paris before embarking on an Australian career. In 1871 he went to Australia where he succeeded as a composer. In 1884, he became unwell and returned to Europe and success at La Scala. He died on 4 May 1914.

Works

 Olympia Valse
 1852 Cleopatra (dance)
 1856 Tarantella nel ballo La giocoliera
 1862 Ondina Polka, Op. 116
 Blumen aus Italien, Op. 217
 1870 Messe Solennelle No.3
 1871 Trickett Galop (celebrating Edward Trickett, a champion Australian rower)
 1877 Giulia Valse
 1879 The Old Corporal Quadrille, dedicated to Eduardo Majeroni
 1883 Adieu Waltz (for his departure from Australia)
 1877 The Geelong Skating Rink Galop
 1890 Cardellino Polka, Op. 123
 Land of the Sunny South, All Hail, an Australian National anthem
 Scottisch, Op. 117
 1879 Sydney Exhibition Cantata, with words by Henry Kendall
 1882 The Bay of Sydney Waltz (La Baja di Sydney Valse)

Recordings
 Belles of Australia Waltz (Sydney Conservatorium)
 The Trickett Galop
 2013 Regina Coeli (Choir of St Magnus-the-Martyr)
 2015 Inexplicable Splendour (Choir of St Magnus-the-Martyr)

Scores

Students
Giorza taught Australian composer Maude FitzStubbs (Mrs Harry Woods) while in Australia

References

1832 births
1914 deaths
Australian classical composers
Australian conductors (music)
Australian male composers
Australian composers
Australian poets
Italian emigrants to Australia